Haney may refer to:

 Haney (surname)

Places

Canada
 Haney, British Columbia

United States
 Haney, Wisconsin, town
 Dallas, West Virginia, also called Haney